Rozhdestvenka is the name of several rural localities in Russia:
Rozhdestvenka, Amur Oblast, a selo in Novosergeyevsky Selsoviet of Seryshevsky District, Amur Oblast
Rozhdestvenka, Astrakhan Oblast, a selo in Batayevsky Selsoviet of Akhtubinsky District, Astrakhan Oblast